Andrew Tangata-Toa (born 15 February 1974) is a Tongan former professional rugby league footballer who played in the 1990s. Primarily a er, he played for the Newcastle Knights, St George Dragons and Huddersfield Giants.

Background
Born on the Gold Coast, Queensland, Tangata-Toa played junior rugby league for the Burleigh Bears and attended Miami State High School.

Playing career
In 1990, Tangata-Toa represented the Queensland under-17 side, kicking three goals in a 14-all draw with New South Wales.

In Round 19 of the 1993 NSWRL season, Tangata-Toa made his first grade debut for the Newcastle Knights in a 14–16 loss to the Manly Sea Eagles. That season, he represented the New South Wales under-19 side. In 1995, Tangata-Toa was a member of the Tonga squad at the 1995 Rugby League World Cup but did not play a game.

In 1997, after four seasons with the Knights, Tangata-Toa joined the St George Dragons. During the 1997 season, he represented the Rest of the World side in an 8–28 loss to Australia. In his two seasons with the Dragons, Tangata-Toa played 26 games, scoring one try.

In 1999, he moved to the Huddersfield Giants in the Super League, playing 15 games in his lone season at the club.

Personal life
Tangata-Toa's younger brother, David, is a former professional rugby league player and coach.

References

1974 births
Living people
Australian sportspeople of Tongan descent
Huddersfield Giants players
St. George Dragons players
Newcastle Knights players
Tongan rugby league players
Rugby league players from Gold Coast, Queensland